The Slovenian First League of women's handball is the top women's handball league in Slovenia. It is organized by the Handball Federation of Slovenia. In the 2022–23 season, the league comprises 15 teams.

List of champions

By season
1991–92 Olimpija
1992–93 Olimpija
1993–94 Olimpija
1994–95 Krim
1995–96 Krim
1996–97 Krim
1997–98 Krim
1998–99 Krim
1999–2000 Krim
2000–01 Krim
2001–02 Krim
2002–03 Krim
2003–04 Krim
2004–05 Krim
2005–06 Krim
2006–07 Krim
2007–08 Krim
2008–09 Krim
2009–10 Krim
2010–11 Krim
2011–12 Krim
2012–13 Krim
2013–14 Krim
2014–15 Krim
2015–16 Zagorje
2016–17 Krim
2017–18 Krim
2018–19 Krim
2019–20 Krim
2020–21 Krim
2021–22 Krim

By club

EHF coefficient

Country ranking
EHF league ranking for the 2022–23 season:

8.  (9)  1. HRL (57.00) 
9.  (8)  Handball Bundesliga Frauen (56.33) 
10.  (11)  1. DRL (38.17)
11.  (10)   SHE Women (37.40)
12.  (13)  PGNiG Superliga (33.00)

References

Women's handball in Slovenia
Women's handball leagues
Handball competitions in Slovenia
Handball
1991 establishments in Slovenia
Sports leagues established in 1991